Dario Martin (19 January 1903 – 30 November 1951) was an Italian footballer who played as a midfielder. He represented the Italy national football team twice, the first being on 24 April 1927, the occasion of a friendly match against France in a 3–3 away draw.

Honours

Player
Torino
Divisione Nazionale: 1927–28 Divisione Nazionale

References

1903 births
1951 deaths
Italian footballers
Italy international footballers
Association football midfielders
Torino F.C. players
Pinerolo F.C. players
Sportspeople from the Metropolitan City of Turin
Footballers from Piedmont
People from Pinerolo